Topia is one of the 39 municipalities of Durango, in north-western Mexico. The municipal seat lies at Topia. The municipality covers an area of 1,617.8 km².

As of 2010, the municipality had a total population of 8,581, up from 7,984 as of 2005. 

As of 2010, the town of Topia had a population of 2,051. Other than the town of Topia, the municipality had 318 localities, none of which had a population over 1,000.

References

Municipalities of Durango